Kuzma may refer to:

Locations
Kuzma, Kuzma, a settlement in the Municipality of Kuzma, Slovenia
Municipality of Kuzma, a municipality in Slovenia

People
Kuzma, a Slavic given name derived from Cosmas
Kuzma Minin, Russian merchant and hero of the Polish-Muscovite War (1605–1618)
Kuzma Derevyanko, Soviet Army officer and signatory to the Japanese surrender of 1945
Kuzma Petrov-Vodkin, Soviet/Russian painter and writer
Kuzma (tepčija), Serbian nobleman
Kuzma (surname)

Organizations
Kuzma (constructor), an American race car manufacturer

See also
Cusma (disambiguation)
Kusma (disambiguation)